Princess Sofia, Duchess of Värmland (Sofia Kristina; née Hellqvist; born 6 December 1984), is a member of the Swedish royal family. Before marrying Prince Carl Philip and becoming a princess of Sweden in 2015, Sofia was a glamour model and reality television contestant. They have three sons, Prince Alexander, Prince Gabriel and Prince Julian, who are fifth, sixth and seventh in the line of succession to the Swedish throne, respectively.

Early life and education
Sofia Hellqvist was born in 1984 at Danderyd Hospital in Danderyd, to a Swedish mother, Marie Britt Rotman (born 1957), a marketing manager in the plastics industry, and a Danish–Swedish father, Erik Oscar Hellqvist (born 1949), an employment counsellor at the Swedish employment agency. She was baptised on 26 May 1985 in Tibble Church. She moved to Älvdalen at the age of six. She has two sisters, Lina Hellqvist (humanitarian project coordinator, born 1982) and Sara Hellqvist (criminologist, born 1988). She attended Älvdalen Montessori School and Älvdal School. She studied the arts programme at Vansbro Education Centre.

Career
At the age of 20, Hellqvist was published in photos in the men's magazine Slitz wearing only a bikini bottom and a live boa constrictor around her upper body and was later voted Miss Slitz 2004 by readers. When her relationship with Prince Carl Philip was revealed in 2010, Expressen republished the photos. Following the Miss Slitz win, Hellqvist was cast in the Paradise Hotel reality show on TV4 where she made it to the final. In the show, she had a much publicised feud with Olinda Castielle and finally voted Castielle off the show.

In 2005, she moved to New York to study accounting, specialising in business development. She has also studied global ethics, child and youth science, children's communication and the UN Convention on the Rights of the Child in theory, and in Swedish practice at Stockholm University. She is also a certified yoga instructor and worked as such in New York.

Back in Sweden she studied in Stockholm, where she also worked part-time as a waitress and glamour model.

Hellqvist was mentioned in some newspapers for having kissed American adult film star Jenna Jameson while in Las Vegas to do a Swedish version of reality show Paradise Hotel.

Marriage and motherhood

In July 2010, the Swedish Royal Court confirmed the relationship between Hellqvist and Prince Carl Philip. In April 2011, the couple moved in together in Djurgården of Stockholm, which was confirmed by the palace.

On 27 June 2014, the couple's engagement was announced, and in December, Hellqvist made an appearance at the Nobel Banquet with her future husband. In May 2015, it was announced that she would receive the title of princess. The couple married at Slottskyrkan in Stockholm on 13 June 2015.

On 19 April 2016, Sofia gave birth to their first child, Prince Alexander Erik Hubertus Bertil, Duke of Södermanland at Danderyd Hospital. Their second child, Prince Gabriel Carl Walter, Duke of Dalarna, was born on 31 August 2017 at Danderyd Hospital. Their third child, Prince Julian Herbert Folke, Duke of Halland, was born on 26 March 2021 at Danderyd Hospital.

On 7 October 2019, Sofia's father-in-law, the king, issued a statement rescinding the royal status of Prince Alexander and Prince Gabriel in an effort to more strictly associate Swedish royalty to the office of the head of state; they are still to be styled as princes and dukes of their provinces, and they remain in the line of succession to the throne. Sofia and Carl Philip commented that their sons now will have more freedom of choice for their future lives.

Charity work 
In 2010, Hellqvist was one of the co-founders of non-profit organisation Project Playground, a charity that assists underprivileged children in South Africa. Princess Sofia is the honorary chair.

To mark the occasion of Prince Carl Philip and Princess Sofia's marriage in 2015, the couple founded Prince Carl Philip and Princess Sofia's Foundation. The foundation's purpose is to counteract bullying.

Princess Sofia is an honorary chair of Sophiahemmet since 2016. She succeeded Princess Christina, Mrs. Magnuson, who had been honorary chair since 1972.

In April 2020, the Princess completed a three-day emergency online training course from Sophiahemmet University, created to help hospitals amidst the COVID-19 pandemic. It was announced that she would work as a volunteer at the Sophiahemmet Hospital in Stockholm, where she would support "doctors and nurses through kitchen shifts, disinfecting instruments and cleaning."

Titles, styles and honours

Sofia is styled as Her Royal Highness Princess Sofia of Sweden, Duchess of Värmland.

Honours

National
:
 Member of the Royal Order of the Seraphim
 Member of the Royal Family Decoration of King Carl XVI Gustaf, 2st Class
 Recipient of the 70th Birthday Badge Medal of King Carl XVI Gustaf

Foreign
: Grand Cross of the Order of the Falcon 
: Knight Grand Cross of the Order of Merit of the Italian Republic
: Grand Cross 1st Class of the Order of Merit of the Federal Republic of Germany
: Dame Grand Cross of the Order of Civil Merit (16 November 2021)
 : Grand Cross of the Order of the White Rose (17 May 2022)
 : Grand Cross of the Order of the Crown (11 October 2022)

References

External links

Royal Court of Sweden - Princess Sofia

1984 births
Living people
People from Danderyd Municipality
People from Älvdalen Municipality
Swedish female models
Yoga teachers
Swedish people of Danish descent
Swedish princesses
Swedish duchesses
Knights Grand Cross of the Order of the Falcon
Order of Civil Merit members
Princesses by marriage
Royalty and nobility models
Grand Crosses of the Order of the Crown (Netherlands)